Abdul Qadir Baloch (born 9 April 1945) is a Pakistani politician and retired army general who served as Minister for States and Frontier Regions in the third Sharif ministry from 2013 to 2017 and in the Abbasi cabinet from August 2017 to May 2018. A leader of the Pakistan Muslim League (Nawaz), Baloch briefly served as the Governor of Balochistan during Pervez Musharraf rule in 2003.

Baloch had been a member of the National Assembly of Pakistan from 2008 to May 2018.

Baloch has four children named Aurangzeb, Jahnzeb, Fauzia and Nazia

Early life
He was born on 9 April 1945.

Military career

Baloch was appointed as field operations commander of the XXX Corps where he oversaw the redeployment of the military troops near border with India. In the wake of the 9/11 attacks in the United States, Baloch was assigned as field operations commander of the XII Corps which had the area of responsibility of the Balochistan.

Political career

In 2001, Baloch was appointed as Martial Law Administrator of Balochistan. In 2003, he received honorable discharge from the army and prematurely retired from the military as corps commander of Quetta to be appointed as Governor of Balochistan.

In 2008 Pakistani general election, Baloch elected as member of the National Assembly of Pakistan from constituency NA-271. In 2010, he joined the Pakistan Muslim League (N). In August 2011, Baloch was selected by PML(N) as the assistant secretaries-general of the PML-N for Balochistan.

In 2013, the PML(N) allotted a party ticket to Baloch for the constituency NA-271 to participate in general elections. Baloch performed well in the election and defeated Ahsanullah Raki of PPP. Later, he was appointed as Minister for States and Frontier Regions by the Prime Minister Nawaz Sharif and took oath on 8 June 2013.

He had ceased to hold ministerial office in July 2017 when the federal cabinet was disbanded following the resignation of Prime Minister Nawaz Sharif after Panama Papers case decision. Following the election of Shahid Khaqan Abbasi as Prime Minister of Pakistan, Baloch was inducted into the federal cabinet of Abbasi and was appointed Minister for States and Frontier Regions for the second time. Upon the dissolution of the National Assembly on the expiration of its term on 31 May 2018, Baloch ceased to hold the office as Federal Minister for States and Frontier Regions.

On 31 October 2020, Baloch decided to resign from the PMLN due to differences with the party's chief Nawaz Sharif and the party's decision not to invite former Balochistan Chief Minister Sardar Sanaullah Zehri, also a leader of the PMLN, to a public gathering of the Pakistan Democratic Movement. The reason the PMLN leadership cited for not inviting Zehri was his tribal differences with Sardar Akhtar Mengal of the Balochistan National Party. Ihsan Iqbal, a senior leader of the PMLN, said Mr. Baloch had the choice to resign if he wished to do so.

Following his resignation, he stated that he could not hold long with the anti-military narrative of the party.

On 8 August 2021 he joined the Pakistan People's Party, who has also held an anti-military narrative calling Former Prime Minister Imran Khan, as selected.

References 

1945 births
Living people
People from Quetta
Baloch people
Pakistan Military Academy alumni
National Defence University, Pakistan alumni
People from Balochistan, Pakistan
Pakistani generals
Governors of Balochistan, Pakistan
Pakistan Muslim League (N) politicians
Pakistani political writers
People of the Kargil War
Pakistani human rights activists
People of the insurgency in Balochistan
Baloch Regiment officers
Pakistani MNAs 2008–2013
Pakistani MNAs 2013–2018
Government ministers of Pakistan